Paata Chakhnashvili is a social psychologist and Pollster with 30 years of experience.See also web page https://www.paatach.com/. He is the author of the first Exit poll in Georgia and post-Soviet countries. Exit Poll was held during a parliamentary election in 1999 for the tele company Rustavi 2, by two independent companies – "Dia" (Pollster Paata Chakhnashvili) and "Gorbi" (Pollster Merab Pachulia).

1985-1987 Psychologist at the All-Soviet Research Institute of Technical Aesthetics, VNIITE (Tbilisi branch)

1986-1992  Senior Psychologist at Uznadze Institute of Psychology, Researcher (Department of Social and Organizational Psychology).

1989-1992 lectures on the Social Psychology at Tbilisi State University’s higher school of business

1992-1993  Lectures on the Psychology at the Tbilisi Medical Institute.

In 1993, in the city of Rustavi, Paata Chakhnashvili with Erosi Kitsmarishvili, Jarji Aqimidze, Dato Dvali and Temur Bzhalava, was taking an active part in creation of the channel "Rustavi 2". In 1993-1994 was the head of "Rustavi 2" social and marketing department and also was an author of informational analytic program.  In 1994 was a nominee of the tele festival "Mana". 

1993-1994 Lectures on the Psychology at Tbilisi Teachers’ Proficiency Institute.

1995-1996 Lectures on the Psychology at Telavi Pedagogic Institute.

1995-2001 Newspaper ALIA - Sociologist, Polster and Marketing consultant.

1997-2001 Insurance Company ALDAGI - Marketing and PR consultant.

1999-2002 Fund for Preservation of Cultural Heritage of Georgia (Joint Program by World Bank)- Head of the Department for Sociology and Social Evaluation.
2002-2003 Fund for Preservation of Cultural Heritage of Georgia (Joint Program by World Bank)- Project Development Manager, Head of the Department of Social Evaluation and PR.

At various times he was a consultant for various televisions: tv-9, "iberia", tv "Mze", tv Imedi. He was also a consultant to the State Television and Radio Corporation for Sociological Surveys. In 2005-2007 he was a member of the TV Imedi Arts Council.

One of the first who started the publication political ratings of the media in Georgia. 

Specializes in public relations and the influence of psychological factors on the communication processes, nonverbal communications (body language training) and image making.

Since 1990, is engaged in consulting for business, media and public organizations, political parties and political leaders. 2003 -2008 was CEO of the Badri Patarkatsishvili's charity foundation and head of charity project supporting the children with leukaemia).  On 7 November 2007, during the massacre of tele company "Imedi", he was inside the "Imedi" building, where he became a victim of violence and abuse (https://gurianews.com/?p=709372). Producer and author of idea of the documentary film Day at Home (One Day Shin) . In 2008, after the death of Patarkacishvli, he was under a repression. 

Chakhnashvili was born on 30 March 1957, in Tbilisi, Georgia. His father is Shalva Chakhnashvili, a Physiologist Professor and his mother is Gulnara Gugushvili – a Biologist, Teather. He finished 55th middle school of Tbilisi. In 1974 was enrolled at Sports Academy in Tbilisi, on the faculty of Sport Journalism.

1976-Actor at Studio Georgia Film 

In 1978 got the diploma in Sport Journalism. In 1978 he decided to continue studying and was enrolled at Tbilisi State University on the faculty of Philosophy and Psychology, profession – Social Psychology, which he finished successfully in 1983 and got a diploma in Social Psychology. On the same year he was sent to raise his qualification at the Fridrich Shiller University, course for Behaviorism. 
1986 -1990 Paata Chakhnashvili worked at D.Uznadze Psychological Institute (Senior Psychologist),  1990-1995 Republican Centre of Applied Psychology (Deputy Director and 1996-2000 General Director).
Vice President of the association of  Young Psychologists and Georgian Psychologists. Co-Founder of Neuro-linguistic Programming Association Georgia (NLPAG) in Georgia . He is an editor of first Georgian "Marketing Communication" text-books first book History of Commercials by Ilia Feradze . Author of the Blog - http://paatachakhnashvili.blogspot.com/, also an author of articles written in internet portals and Social Media: https://1tv.ge/news/paata-chakhnashvili-agresia-gadamdebia-da-momaval-taobas-bavshvobidan-unda-vaswavlot-rom-agresia-aucilebeli-ar-aris/; https://issuu.com/chakhnashvilipaata?issuu_product=header&issuu_subproduct=publisher-suite-workflow&issuu_context=link&issuu_cta=profile; 

Since 2011 he actively engaged in teaching activities. He is a lecturer in the psychology of communication and public relations at the PR School of Georgian American University .  A year later, in 2013, he has been teaching history of PR .  Since 2013 also works as a Body Language trainer, at the Center of Training, Recruiting and Consulting - "BeMark". Since 2015, the first time in Georgia begins training in Emotional Intelligence (EQ) at Education agency Cambridge Study .

References

1957 births
Living people
People from Tbilisi
Social psychologists from Georgia (country)